Bruna Tenório (born 27 June 1989) is a Brazilian model.

Personal life 
Tenório was born in Maceió, Brazil. She is of Native Brazilian descent.

She married Felipe Faria in May 2017. They have a son, born December 2020.

Career
Tenório started her career in 2006 when she walked the runway for designers like Chanel, Christian Dior and Dolce & Gabbana in Paris and Milan. After that, she was already featured as a rising star by Style.com.

Since her debut, in 2006, Tenório has been the face of advertising campaigns including Anna Sui, Gap, Kenzo, D&G, Chanel Haute Couture, Vera Wang, Valentino Haute Couture, Me & city. She has been on the covers of top fashion magazines including international editions of L'Officiel, Vogue and Elle. She has walked the most important shows in the Paris, New York and Milan fashion seasons like Alexandre Herchcovitch, Chanel, Dolce & Gabbana, Louis Vuitton, Marc Jacobs, Versace, Carolina Herrera, Christian Dior, Michael Kors and many others.

Tenório is represented by Women Model Management in New York, Paris and Milan, Storm Models in London and Ford Models in São Paulo.

References

External links 
 
 
 Bruna's official blog
 
 
 Bruna Tenório at Stylished.de

1989 births
Living people
People from Maceió
Brazilian people of indigenous peoples descent
Brazilian female models
21st-century Brazilian women